The Franconian Heights Nature Park  is a nature park in Germany that covers an area of approximately 1,100 square kilometres. It is located northeast of the town of Rothenburg ob der Tauber in Bavaria and covers most of the hill ridge known as the Franconian Heights, as well as areas to the west and up to the Sulzach.  The nature park is in one of the sunniest areas of southern Germany and offers a very varied landscape with mixed forests, rivers, vineyards and dry habitats.

See also 
 List of nature parks in Germany

References

External links
 Website of the park

Protected areas of Bavaria